The soundtrack album for Eternal Sunshine of the Spotless Mind was released by Hollywood Records on March 16, 2004. It features the score, composed by Los Angeles musician Jon Brion, as well as songs from artists Electric Light Orchestra (ELO), the Polyphonic Spree, the Willowz, and Don Nelson. Beck, in a collaboration with Jon Brion, provides a cover version of the Korgis' "Everybody's Got to Learn Sometime".  Many of the vocal songs either revolve around memories or the sun.

Details

Jon Brion provided much of the music for the film.  Although only one track ("Strings That Tie to You") features his singing (similar to the soundtrack for Punch-Drunk Love), his next soundtrack (for I Heart Huckabees) would feature seven vocal songs.

The garage rock band The Willowz contributed two songs to the soundtrack, and would later contribute songs to director Michel Gondry's next film The Science of Sleep.

"Mr. Blue Sky" isn't featured in the film, but plays in the theatrical trailer and most advertising spots for the film.

Brion's song "Showtime" on this soundtrack should not be confused with the song "Showtime" he wrote for the  film Magnolia.

Three filmi songs from old Hindi movies can be heard playing in the background (when Clementine invites Joel to her apartment for a drink). These are "Mera Man Tera Pyasa" (My mind yearns for you) from the movie Gambler (1971) performed by Mohammed Rafi, "Tere Sang Pyar Main" from the movie Nagin (1976) performed by Lata Mangeshkar, and "Wada Na Tod" (Break not the promise) also by Lata Mangeshkar from the movie Dil Tujhko Diya (Gave my heart to you, 1987). All three songs are listed in the original soundtrack credits.

Albums appearing in the movie
Several albums were mentioned in the shooting script and appeared in the final cut of the film.  Among these are Brian Eno's Music for Airports (1978), the instrumental live version of the same by Bang on a Can (1998), Björk's Homogenic (1997) and Tom Waits's Rain Dogs (1985).

Track listing
All tracks by Jon Brion, except where noted.

Adaptation

Roc Nation artist Jay Electronica sampled five Jon Brion compositions from the soundtrack for his debut mixtape Act I: Eternal Sunshine (The Pledge). The tracks first appeared in 2007 on Jay Electronica's Myspace page.

External links
"I Wonder" Music Video - Music video for the song "I Wonder"

Jon Brion albums
Albums produced by Jon Brion
2004 soundtrack albums
Hollywood Records soundtracks
Science fiction film soundtracks
Comedy film soundtracks
Drama film soundtracks